Tatiana Arfel (born 17 May 1979 in Paris) is a French writer.

Biography 
Psychologist by training, Tatiana Arfel is also a graduate in modern literature.

Works 
2008: L’Attente du soir, Paris, José Corti Éditions, series "Merveilleux", 325 p. .
- Prix du Salon du premier roman de Draveil 2009.
 - Prix Emmanuel Roblès 2009.
 - Prix Alain-Fournier 2010
 - Prix des académiciens des Genêts de Bron 2009–2010
 - Prix Jeune Talent littéraire des clubs de lecture de Saint Germain en Laye.
 - Prix Biblioblog 2010.
2010: Des clous, Paris, José Corti Éditions, coll. « Domaine français », 319 p. .
2013: La Deuxième Vie d’Aurélien Moreau, Paris, José Corti Éditions, series "Domaine français", 319 p. 
2015: Les Inconfiants, ill. de Julien Cordier, Marseille, France, Éditions Le Bec en l’air, 125 p.

References

External links 
 Tatiana Arfel on Babelio
 Tatiana Arfel on France Inter
 Tatiana Arfel, Café littéraire de Sainte Cécile les Vignes on YouTube

1979 births
Living people
French women novelists
21st-century French women writers
21st-century French novelists
Prix Emmanuel Roblès recipients
Writers from Paris
Prix Alain-Fournier winners